The HEC O'Connor Cup, also referred to as the Michael O'Connor Cup, is the senior Ladies' Gaelic football intervarsity cup competition. It features teams representing universities and institutes of technology from the Republic of Ireland and Northern Ireland. It is organised by the Higher Education Colleges committee of the Ladies' Gaelic Football Association. Mary Immaculate College won the inaugural competition in  1987. University of Limerick is the competitions most successful team. Since 2018 the  O'Connor Cup has been sponsored by Gourmet Food Parlour. It was previously sponsored by the Irish Examiner. During the 2010s the O'Connor Cup final has been broadcast live by TG4 and/or YouTube. Since 1993 teams knocked out in the early rounds of the O'Connor Cup have subsequently competed in the consolation competition, the O'Connor Shield.

Finals

Winners by team

O'Connor Shield
Since 1993 teams knocked out in the early rounds of the O'Connor Cup have subsequently competed in the consolation competition, the Micheal O'Connor Shield. In 2019 the Shield was effectively a 5th/6th place play-off.

References

1987 establishments in Ireland
Gaelic games competitions at Irish universities
Ladies' Gaelic football competitions